Fayzobod (Fayzabad) is a town in Tajikistan. It is located in the Rasht Valley, 50 km east of Dushanbe. It is the seat of Fayzobod District. The Sari Mazar mausoleum in Fayzobod holds the remains of 8th-century Sufi saint Abu Abdurahmon from Balkh. The population of the town is 10,400 (January 2020 estimate).

References 

Populated places in Districts of Republican Subordination